R. gardneri may refer to:

 Radaisia gardneri, a cyanobacteria species in the genus Radaisia
 Rhipidomys gardneri, the Gardner's climbing mouse, a rodent species from South America
 Rhizanthella gardneri, the Western underground orchid, a plant species found in Western Australia

See also 
 Gardneri